The Vigorous Burmese Student Warriors (abbreviated VBSW) were an armed opposition group in Myanmar (Burma). It was formed by students after the 8888 uprising, in opposition to the ruling military junta at the time.

The group was labeled (but not officially listed as) a terrorist organisation by the Burmese government, after they gained notoriety by raiding and holding hostages at the Burmese embassy in Bangkok, Thailand in October 1999.

History
After the 1990 general election, which was unrecognised and suppressed by the newly formed military junta, many students that participated in the 8888 uprising fled the country and went to neighbouring Thailand. In August 1999, the VBSW was formed as an armed opposition group, which differentiated from groups such as the All Burma Students' Democratic Front, which originally sought democracy through peaceful demonstrations.

On 1 October 1999, a group of five members raided the Burmese consulate in Bangkok and took 89 people hostage. The group demanded that negotiations be opened between the National League for Democracy (NLD) and the military junta, and that a new Hluttaw (national parliament) be convened based on the results of the 1990 election. However, the group soon relaxed their demands and began to release hostages, and the Thai government eventually escorted the VBSW members by helicopter to the Thai-Myanmar border.

Despite openly supporting the democracy movement in Myanmar, lead figures of the movement such as Aung San Suu Kyi, the President of the NLD, have denounced the VBSW, and their use of violence to achieve their goals.

Notes

References

History of Myanmar (1948–present)
Paramilitary organisations based in Myanmar
Politics of Myanmar
Rebel groups in Myanmar
Student organizations established in 1999
Student organisations in Myanmar
1999 establishments in Myanmar